Olaf Holmstrup (5 October 1930 – 11 September 2020) was a Danish cyclist. He competed in the men's tandem event at the 1952 Summer Olympics.

References

External links
 

1930 births
2020 deaths
Danish male cyclists
Olympic cyclists of Denmark
Cyclists at the 1952 Summer Olympics
People from Horsens
Sportspeople from the Central Denmark Region